The Atlantic City Jitney Association (ACJA) is an association of operators of minibus service in Atlantic City, New Jersey, providing service at all times on 3 fixed routes, daytime service on a fourth fixed route, and bus-to-rail connections from the Atlantic City Rail Terminal, providing connections to Atlantic City Line trains. The jitney service in Atlantic City started in 1915.  The type of vehicle used has changed several times over the years. The classic International Harvester Metro Van was used in the 1960s. In 2010, the service switched to a fleet of bright green and white Ford E-450 vehicles powered by compressed natural gas.

Routes

Fixed-route service
The ACJA operates service on four routes. The one-way fare for the jitney is $2.25.

Bus-to-rail shuttles
These routes run to and from the Atlantic City Rail Terminal, fare-free. These lines were formerly operated by New Jersey Transit.

See also
List of New Jersey Transit bus routes (500-549) – other local routes within Atlantic City and Atlantic County
List of New Jersey Transit bus routes (550-599) – long-distance service from the Atlantic City Bus Terminal

References

External links
Atlantic City Jitney Association

Bus transportation in New Jersey
Transport companies established in 1915
Atlantic City, New Jersey
Transportation in Atlantic County, New Jersey
1915 establishments in New Jersey